Paul Hunter (born 9 February 1993) is a former professional Australian rules footballer who for played the St Kilda Football Club in the Australian Football League (AFL).

Early life 
Hunter was raised in Redhead in New South Wales, near Newcastle. Hunter began playing football for Warners Bay Football club. In 2013, Hunter moved to Queensland to play with Redland in south east Brisbane who competed in the NEAFL. Hunter won the NEAFL Rising Star award in 2014 and was also awarded Redland's Best and Fairest, drawing the attention of AFL recruiters.

AFL career

Adelaide Crows 
Hunter was drafted as a 22-year-old in the 2016 AFL Rookie Draft at pick number 13 overall. He spent three years on the Crows' rookie list, but was unable to break into the senior side with Sam Jacobs and Reilly O'Brien preferred by the Crows. He was redrafted by the Crows with pick 24 in the 2018 Rookie Draft, but again failed to earn senior selection. He was again delisted at the conclusion of the 2019 season.

South Adelaide (SANFL) 
Hunter signed with VFL side Williamstown in early 2020, but the season was cancelled due to the COVID-19 pandemic. He quickly moved to South Australia where he joined South Australian National Football League (SANFL) side South Adelaide. Playing alongside future St Kilda teammate Tom Highmore, Hunter had a prolific season and was named in the SANFL Team of the Year.

St Kilda 

Hunter was given a second chance at AFL level by St Kilda, which selected him for the Pre-Season Supplemental Selection period in February 2021. He was invited to play in an intraclub game where he impressed in the absence of injured players Rowan Marshall, Paddy Ryder and Shaun McKernan. Hunter's performance earned him a contract at his second AFL club. He played in the Saints' two pre-season practice matches against North Melbourne and Carlton. With regular ruckmen Marshall and Ryder unavailable, he finally made his AFL debut at age 28 in the Saints' Round 1 game against the Greater Western Sydney Giants in Sydney.

In October 2021, Hunter was delisted by St Kilda.

References

External links

St Kilda Football Club players
1993 births
Living people
Australian rules footballers from New South Wales
South Adelaide Football Club players
Redland Football Club players
Adelaide Football Club (SANFL) players
Sandringham Football Club players